Jalapa is a department of Guatemala, in the south east-of the republic. The capital is the city of Jalapa.

In 2018 the department of Jalapa had a population of 342,923. The majority is ladino, of predominantly European descent, with sizeable minorities of K'iche' and Poqomam Maya. The main agricultural products are cattle, sorghum, tobacco, onion and maize.

Municipalities 

 Jalapa
 Mataquescuintla
 Monjas
 San Carlos Alzatate
 San Luis Jilotepeque
 San Manuel Chaparrón
 San Pedro Pinula

Volcanoes
Volcán Jumay

References

External links
 all the information about Jalapa
 Interactive department map
Wells of Hope

 
Departments of Guatemala